The International Conference on the Physics of Semiconductors (also known by the acronym ICPS) is a biennial conference series on semiconductor science. This biennial meeting is the premier forum for reporting all aspects of semiconductor physics including electronic, structural, optical, magnetic and transport properties. The conference will reflect the state of the art in semiconductor physics with a heritage dating back to the 1950s.

Conference list

External links
ICPS 27 at Flagstaff
ICPS 28 at Vienna
ICPS 29 at Rio de Janeiro
ICPS 30 at Seoul
ICPS 32 at Austin
ICPS 33 at Beijing
ICPS 34 at Montpellier
   ICPS 35 in Sydney

Physics conferences